J. Pavlikevitch (active 1893–1936) was a watercolor painter, putatively of Russian origin, who was active in Istanbul, Turkey, in the early decades of the 20th century.

Introduction

Very little is known about the artist, J. Pavlikevitch (or Pavlikevich). It is thought that he (or she) was part of a large number of civilians and members of the White Russian Army (collectively known as white émigrés) who, after struggling against the Bolsheviks in the Russian civil war following the Soviet Revolution, retreated to the South Crimea and then to Istanbul, where they stayed in the Imperial city until about 1925. Shortly after, and with the help of charities and international organizations, they departed the city and emigrated to other countries.

Biography

Virtually nothing is known about this watercolor artist or his life.  It is assumed, based on the dates of his works (1893–1936), that he was one of the many 'old establishment' who fled Russia before or during the revolution and succeeding civil war. But aside from a few dozen watercolors, there is no other record of his life.

Known work

Works by this artist have been sold at many fine auction houses around the world (examples include Skinners, Bonhams, Christies), commanding high prices solely on the strength of his work and in spite of the fact that nothing is known about his life, training, or other accomplishments.

Examples of J. Pavlikevitch's work may be found in several books, including Views of Russia & Russian Works on Paper, plates 81–87, and Russian Orientalism & Constantinople, plates 61–66.

Select list of works

His more notable works include:
 Stroll along the Bosphorus
 On the Bosphorus, at the Entrance to the Golden Horn, circa 1900
 Constantinople Street Cafe 
 Street Vendors, 
 Near the Galata Bridge
 Sunset on the Golden Horn, Istanbul
 Figures in the Courtyard of the Bayezid II Mosque
 The Interior of a Mosque
 Constantinople Street Café
 Market Scene

See also

List of Orientalist artists
Orientalism

Notes

References

[

Watercolorists
Orientalist painters
White Russian emigrants to Turkey
Painters from the Russian Empire
Year of birth missing
Year of death missing